Scott Hardy is an underground Techno DJ and musician who has appeared in the UK and Australia, and on Second Life since 2001 to present. As an Audio Engineer he was published in New Zealand.

Biography
He was resident DJ and promoter for the techno night dxdt in London for several years, and ran a weekly internet radio show on Pulseradio alongside it.

He is credited with the soundtrack music for the 2001 British film To A Future... With Love. Scott released his first EP on vinyl in 2001 in the Electronica / Hard House style.
He released his first original album online in 2006 in the genre Electronica / Minimalist / Techno.

The name dxdt was originally a collaborative name invented by Scott Hardy which included other artists although he now often refers to himself simply as dj dxdt.

In 2013 Scott supported Luke Slater for part of his Australian tour.

Published works
Hardy, Scott (co-authored with George Dodd)(6 No 2, 21-26, 1994). Performance Variation of Panel-type Absorbers with Positioning of Flow Resistance. New Zealand Acoustics.

References

External links
dj dxdt on Soundcloud
To a Future... With Love

Living people
Year of birth missing (living people)